Acalolepta andamanica is a species of beetle in the family of the Longhorn beetles. It was described by Stephan von Breuning in 1935. It is known from the Nicobar and Andaman Islands.

References

Acalolepta
Beetles described in 1935